Fredrikke Egeberge (23 November 1815 – 16 May 1861) was a Norwegian pianist and composer.

Annichen Fredrikke Sophie Egeberge was born in Christiania of parents Westye Egeberg (1770–1830, a Danish immigrant) and Anna Sophie Muus (1775–1862). Her family was wealthy through her father's lumber company, and Egeberg was the youngest of nine children and the only daughter. She was a sister of Westye Martinus Egeberg and physician Christian Egeberg, and an aunt of Ferdinand Julian Egeberg, Einar Westye Egeberg, Sr. and Theodor Christian Egeberg. Violinist Ole Bull was a friend of the family and often played at the family chamber music concerts. Egeberg's brother Christian became an accomplished amateur cellist, her two nieces, Anna Egeberg and Fredrikke Lindboe became composers of songs and piano pieces.

Egeberg became an accomplished pianist, playing piano at Old Aker Church near the family property of Løkken and sometimes in concerts with the Musical Lyceum orchestra. After 1840, Egeberg was very productive as a composer, writing more than thirty songs and piano and choral works and achieving popularity in the 1850s. Fredrikke Egeberg lived on the farm Berg of Sem in Vestfold, where she died in 1861.

Works
Selected works include:
4 Kirkesange, 1850
Norske Sange, ca. 1850
Sex Sange uden Ord for klaver, ca. 1850
Arioso og Springdans, 1851
3 Sange af Arne (text: B. Bjørnson), 1876

Neath Yon Grey Tower piece written1800?(i have the original manuscript, hand written.).

References

1815 births
1861 deaths
19th-century classical composers
Women classical composers
Norwegian people of Danish descent
19th-century Norwegian composers
19th-century women composers